The Seventh Grave is a 1965 Italian horror film directed by Garibaldi Serra Caracciolo.

Cast

Production
The Seventh Grave was produced by F.G.S. International Pictures, a company founded in December 1964 by Felice Falvo, Arturo Giorni and Alessandro Santini.

Santini also wrote the story and screenplay with director Garibaldia Serra Caracciolo and actor Antonio Casale. The film was shot in three and a half weeks at Balsorano castle and Olimpia Studios in Rome from February to March 1965. The films budget was around 40 million Italian lire.

Release
A photonovel of the film was published in issue 52 of the Malìa in May 1965 while the film was released on August 18, 1965. In 1968, Fortuanato Misiano's company Romana Cinematografica bought the rights from the producers and attempted to get the subsidies from 1965's Corona law. The film was rejected by the Ministerial commission who unanimously decided that the "technical eligibility and sufficient artistic, culture and spectacular qualities" that the law demanded were not present.

Reception
Roberto Curti, author of Italian Gothic Horror Films, 1957-1969 noted the films amateur qualities such as breaking the 180 degree rule and lacking continuity between shots and that "lighting was passable at best". The script was described as one that "haphazardly assembles a bunch of Gothic stereotypes" and that the plot, the production clearly saw The Cat and the Canary (1927) "one too many times".

See also
List of horror films of 1965
List of Italian films of 1965

References

Footnotes

Sources

External links
 

1965 films
1965 horror films
Italian horror films
1960s Italian-language films
Gothic horror films
1960s Italian films